The 2006 European Rally Championship season was the 54th season of the FIA European Rally Championship. Italian driver Giandomenico Basso won his first European rally championship after winning 4 rallies.

Calendar and winners
The calendar of the 2007 European rally championship season consisted of 10 events.

Selected entries

References

Rally
European Rally Championship
European Rally Championship seasons